Charles Solomon Sultan (November 16, 1913 in Brooklyn, New York — February 28, 1984 in Camarillo, California) was an American illustrator and editor known for his work during the Golden Age of Comic Books, and for his later work in pulp fiction.

Professional life

In 1931, Sultan quit school to become a sign painter, so as to help support his family financially; he was so successful that he was able to enroll in the Art Students League of New York, where he studied under Walter Biggs, John Steuart Curry,  and George Bridgman.

He began illustrating various pulp magazines in 1936. In 1939, he joined Eisner & Iger, and by 1940 was an art director for Harry "A" Chesler. He also worked for Fawcett Comics (where he created the character of "Spy Smasher"), Fiction House, and Quality Comics.

In 1942, Sultan was drafted into the US Military, and served four years, during which he drew comic strips for a military newspaper. He subsequently illustrated comic books for DC Comics, EC Comics, Better Publications, and a variety of other publishers. He also edited and published pocket books, and provided illustrations for adventure magazines.

Personal life
Sultan's brother-in-law was Lou Fine.

References

External links
Charles Sultan at the Grand Comics Database

American comics artists
Pulp fiction artists
1913 births
1984 deaths
Art Students League of New York alumni
People from Brooklyn
American people of Russian-Jewish descent
American people of Latvian-Jewish descent
United States Army personnel of World War II
Jewish American artists
Golden Age comics creators